Anathallis angulosa is a species of orchid plant native to Ecuador.

References 

angulosa
Flora of Ecuador